A Gooch crucible, named after Frank Austin Gooch, is a filtration device for laboratory use (and was also called a Gooch filter). It is convenient for collecting a precipitate directly within the vessel in which it is to be dried, possibly ashed, and finally weighed in gravimetric analysis.

The device was originally a standard platinum laboratory crucible with a perforated base into which asbestos pulp was placed to form the filter mat. The crucible was then heated in an oven to dry out until it attained constant weight. The use of these materials meant that after filtration, the crucible and its contents could be subjected to high temperature to dry the filtrate and possibly oxidize or ash it to minimum weight. However, because of the high cost of platinum, versions made of porcelain were introduced in 1882. Some Gooch crucibles, such as the one in the drawing, permit two layers of asbestos to be used, separated by a perforated porcelain plate.
 
Other inorganic fibers, notably glass, have been used in place of asbestos. Gooch crucibles made of borosilicate glass with fritted glass bases are more common today. Gooch crucibles made of platinum may still be required for the most corrosive materials, porcelain is used where ashing at high temperature is required, and those made of borosilicate glass are adequate for drying.

They may also be used for collection and processing of biological tissue samples within the same container.

See also
 Aspirator (pump)
 Filter flask

References

Laboratory equipment